The Kansas City Blues were a United States minor-league hockey team based in Kansas City, Missouri that played in the Central Hockey League (CHL) from 1967 to 1972, and again in the 1976–77 season, mainly as an affiliate of the in-state St. Louis Blues of the National Hockey League (NHL).

The 1967 Blues were owned by Missouri Lieutenant Governor (1968-1972) William S. Morris, and represented the return of hockey to Kansas City for the first time in over 30 years. Morris was determined to bring an NHL team to Kansas City and tried to lay the groundwork by convincing his friend Sid Soloman, owner of the St. Louis Blues, to create a farm team in Kansas City.  The Blues made history on February 21, 1971, when Blues goalie Michel Plasse became the first goaltender to score a goal in a professional hockey game, scoring against the Oklahoma City Blazers. This goal was unfortunately witnessed by few as a snow storm was moving through the Kansas City area causing even the team's owner to leave the arena early.

Although the Blues weren't always winners on the ice, they brought an exciting brand of hockey to Kansas City. Claude Cardin, who played in three seasons for the team, was once featured on the cover of a prominent Kansas City magazine with a chart of all of the scars on his face superimposed on his picture. Hardly any of his face was visible. Hockey from 1967 to 1972 featured fights that erupted into bench clearing brawls and some that erupted outside the rink with fans joining the action. Few players wore helmets in those days. Many future St. Louis Blues players made appearances on the ice at the American Royal Building, if only briefly, which was a thrill for fans of hockey of that era.

The first incarnation of the Kansas City Blues played their home games at the American Royal Building, while the second incarnation played their home games at Kemper Arena, once the NHL's Kansas City Scouts moved to Denver and became the Colorado Rockies.

References

External links
Kansas City Blues at Internet Hockey Database

Sports in the Kansas City metropolitan area
Defunct Central Hockey League teams
Professional ice hockey teams in Missouri
Defunct ice hockey teams in the United States
Central Professional Hockey League teams
Ice hockey clubs established in 1967
Ice hockey clubs disestablished in 1972
Ice hockey clubs established in 1976
Ice hockey clubs disestablished in 1977
St. Louis Blues minor league affiliates
1967 establishments in Missouri
1972 disestablishments in Missouri
1976 establishments in Missouri
1977 disestablishments in Missouri